The yellow-fronted canary  (Crithagra mozambica) is a small passerine bird in the finch family. It is sometimes known in aviculture as the green singing finch.

The yellow-fronted canary was formerly placed in the genus Serinus, but phylogenetic analysis using mitochondrial and nuclear DNA sequences found that genus to be polyphyletic. The genus was therefore split and a number of species including the yellow-fronted canary were moved to the resurrected genus Crithagra Swainson 1827.

This bird is a resident breeder in Africa south of the Sahara Desert. Its habitat is open woodland and cultivation. It nests in trees, laying three or four eggs in a compact cup nest.  It has been introduced to the Hawaiian Islands, where it is found on western Hawaii, southeastern Oahu and Molokai.

The yellow-fronted canary is a common, gregarious seedeater. It is 11–13 cm in length. The adult male has a green back and brown wings and tail. The underparts and rump are yellow, and the head is yellow with a grey crown and nape and a black malar stripe. The female is similar, but with a weaker head pattern and duller underparts. Juveniles are greyer than the female, especially on the head.

Its song is a warbled zee-zeree-chereeo.

Subspecies
Crithagra mozambica mozambica: coastal Kenya and Mafia Island (Tanzania) south to Zimbabwe, Mozambique, eastern and southeastern Botswana, and northeastern South Africa (North West and Limpopo to Free State)
Crithagra mozambica punctigula: Cameroon (north to Toukte, Grand Capitaine and Koum)
Crithagra mozambica caniceps: Senegal to Cameroon (south to Benue plain)
Crithagra mozambica tando: Gabon to north Angola and south west Democratic Republic of the Congo; introduced São Tomé island, São Tomé and Príncipe
Crithagra mozambica vansoni: Extreme south east Angola and adjacent Namibia to north Botswana, south west Zambia
Crithagra mozambica barbata: southern Chad, Central African Republic, western Sudan, western and southern South Sudan, eastern Democratic Republic of the Congo, Uganda, southwestern Kenya, and central Tanzania
Crithagra mozambica samaliyae: SE Democratic Republic of the Congo to sw Tanzania and adjacent Zambia
Crithagra mozambica grotei: southeastern Sudan (east of the Nile), eastern South Sudan, and western and southwestern Ethiopia
Crithagra mozambica gommaensis: Eritrea and northwestern and central Ethiopia
Crithagra mozambica granti: eastern South Africa (Mpumalanga and KwaZulu-Natal south to Eastern Cape), eastern Eswatini, and southern Mozambique

References

 Birds of The Gambia by Barlow, Wacher and Disley, 
 Finches and Sparrows by Clement, Harris and Davis,

External links

 Yellow-fronted canary - Species text in The Atlas of Southern African Birds.

yellow-fronted canary
Birds of Sub-Saharan Africa
yellow-fronted canary
yellow-fronted canary